"Doggfather" is a single by American rapper Snoop Dogg featuring vocals by American musician Charlie Wilson. It was released on August 26, 1997 as the third and final single from Snoop's second album Tha Doggfather (1996). Daz Dillinger produced "Doggfather", and wrote it with Snoop Doggy Dogg and Charlie Wilson. The hip hop song samples "Humpin'" from Wilson's group The Gap Band. "Doggfather" didn't chart in the US, but peaked at number 20 in both New Zealand and the UK.

The song's music video is shot in black-and white and features Snoop in a 1940s gangster club setting.

Background
"Doggfather" features Charlie Wilson and it is produced by Snoop Doggy Dogg's Death Row label-mate Daz Dillinger and mixed by DJ Pooh. The song samples Humpin', a 1980 song by featured performer Charlie Wilson's longtime group, The Gap Band. Throughout the song, there are subtle references to Snoop's murder trial which took place prior to the album's release. At the end of the second verse, Snoop raps "Man, you know I ain't tryin' to floss; but ermm murder (murder) murder was the case that they lost".

There is a remix of the song produced by Timbaland that was found on the original single and most currently on The Death Row Singles Collection.

Music video
In the music video it shows Snoop and actor Dave Foley (in the character of a Peter Lorre inspired club owner) sitting at a table in a 1940s-based mansion discussing how Snoop's friends are abusing their power and how they need to "get a jobby job" (referencing the intro from the Gin & Juice music video). Snoop slaps the surprised club owner across the face, leading into the song with Snoop stating "play it again Sam". It shows classic dancing like the boogie and Snoop performing on stage for the rich people in the mansion. Later, Foley's character walks back to Snoop telling him he has no respect for him, and he will no longer stand it and again gets hurt; this time by using Foley's finger to light a cigarette. The whole video was filmed in black and white to give it a "classic gangster feeling".

Track listing

Charts

References

1996 songs
1997 singles
Snoop Dogg songs
Songs written by Snoop Dogg
Gangsta rap songs
Songs written by Daz Dillinger
Songs written by Charlie Wilson (singer)
Death Row Records singles